Niobium(III) chloride also known as niobium trichloride is a compound of niobium and chlorine.  The binary phase NbCl3 is not well characterized but many adducts are known.

Synthesis

Nb3Cl8 is produced by reduction of niobium(V) chloride with hydrogen, or just by heating.

Salt-free reduction of dimethoxyethane solution of NbCl5 with 1,4-disilyl-cyclohexadiene in the presence of 3-hexyne produces the coordination complex NbCl3(dimethoxyethane)(3-hexyne):
 NbCl5  +  C6H6(SiMe3)2  +  C2Et2 + dme  →   NbCl3(dme)(C2Et2)  +  C6H6  +  2 Me3SiCl

An impure dimethoxyethane (dme) adduct of niobium trichloride was produced by reduction of a dme solution of niobium pentachloride with tributyltin hydride:
NbCl5  +  2 Bu3SnH  +  MeOCH2CH2OMe  →  NbCl3(MeOCH2CH2OMe)  + 2 Bu3SnCl

Structure
Nb3Cl8 has a hexagonal close packed array of chloride ions. Triangles of niobium occur in octahedral spaces in the chloride array. The compositions with higher chloride have some niobium atoms missing from the structure, creating vacancies and giving rise to nonstoichiometric compounds. NbCl4 has this pattern of vacancies stretched until the niobium atoms are in pairs rather than triangles. So NbCl3 can be considered as a solid solution of Nb3Cl8 and Nb2Cl8.

The colour of niobium trichloride varies depending on the niobium:chloride ratio. NbCl2.67 is green, while NbCl3.13 is brown.

Reactions

When heated to over 600 °C niobium trichloride disproportionates to niobium metal and niobium pentachloride.

Adducts
NbCl3(dimethoxyethane) has received significant attention as a reagent for reductive coupling of carbonyls and imines. It is sold as a 1,2-dimethoxyethane complex. Nb(III) adducts are also known for 1,4-dioxane and diethyl ether.

Niobium(III) chloride forms a series of compounds with the formula Nb2Cl6Lx with Nb=Nb double bond. With tertiary phosphines and arsines, the complexes are edge-share bioctahedra, e.g., Nb2Cl6(PPhMe2)4. 
Thioethers form adducts with one bridging thioether (R2S).  These face-sharing bioctahedra have the formula Nb2X6(R2S)3 (X = Cl, Br).

References

Niobium(III) compounds
Chlorides
Non-stoichiometric compounds